John Wallace (November 18, 1821 – January 1, 1896) was a New Brunswick farmer and political figure. He represented Albert in the House of Commons of Canada as a Liberal member from 1867 to 1878 and then from 1883 to 1887 as a Liberal and then as a Liberal-Conservative.

He was born in Hillsborough, New Brunswick in 1812, the son of James Wallace and Catherine Copp, and grew up there. His grandparents had come to New Brunswick from Donegal in northern Ireland. Wallace was president of the Albert Agricultural Society and also a justice of the peace. Besides operating a large farm, he also owned a sawmill and was a director of the Albert Southern Railway. Wallace was originally a Liberal. After his election in 1882 was appealed, he was elected again in an 1883 by-election after running as a Liberal-Conservative.

He was married three times: to Eleanor Russell in 1846, to Cynthia Foss in 1859 and to Charlotte Stackford in 1872.

Electoral record

References 

1821 births
1896 deaths
Liberal Party of Canada MPs
Conservative Party of Canada (1867–1942) MPs
Members of the House of Commons of Canada from New Brunswick
Canadian justices of the peace